Scandia Township may refer to the following townships in the United States:

 Scandia Township, Polk County, Minnesota
 Scandia Township, Bottineau County, North Dakota
 Scandia Township, Republic County, Kansas

See also 
 Scandia Valley Township, Morrison County, Minnesota
 New Scandia Township, MN